This is a list in alphabetical order of cricketers who played first-class cricket for the Indians cricket team, a side which played matches in India, almost all of which were played against the Europeans cricket team. The teams played an annual series of matches, known as the Madras Presidency Matches, between the 1915/16 season and 1951/52, with most of the matches given first-class status. These matches were all played on the Madras Cricket Club Ground in the Madras Presidency, present day Chennai.

Two other matches were played in India by teams named Indians, both at the Bombay Gymkhana Ground. One, in November 1922, was also played against a team named Europeans, and one in December 1926 where a touring English side which represented the Marylebone Cricket Club were the opposition. Players who appeared for Indians in both of these matches have been included in the list. Those who played in matches played by touring Indian sides, which play under the name Indians when not playing against other national sides, have not been included.

The details are the player's name followed by the years in which he was active as a first-class player for the side. Note that many players represented other first-class teams besides the Indians.

A
Abdul Aziz (1922/23) 
Abdus Salaam (1922/23) 
A. Alagarathnan (1920/21)
Bellipadi Chandrahasa Alva (1944/45-1947/48) 
A. Ananthanarayanan (1943/44)
T. P. Aruvumudu (1924/25)

B
T. Bangarababu (1922/23–1923/24)
B. S. R. Bhadradri (1937/38–1944/45)
K. S. Bhandari (1924/25)
B. Bhaskar Rao (1917/18–1925/26)
M. V. Bobjee (1945/46–1946/47)

C
Thiruvenkati Chari (1932/33–1939/40) 
R. Charry (1916/17)
Sorabji Colah (1925/26)

D
Safi Darashah (1929/30) 
S. G. Deenan (1937/38–1938/39) 
Dinkar Deodhar (1926/27) 
R. Dorairajan (1947/48)
T. M. Doraiswami (1938/39)

E
M. Ethirajulu (1915/16)

F
Feroze Khan (1922/23)

G
C. R. Ganapathy (1915/16–1928/29)
Shankarrao Godambe (1926/27) 
Morappakam Gopalan (1926/27–1947/48) 
S. Gopalaswami
Grandhi (1925/26)
P. S. Grant (1922/23)
S. K. Gurunathan (1945/46)

H
Syed Mohammad Hadi (1935/36)
Mohammad Hussain (1925/26–1935/36) 
Hyder Ali (1935/36)

J
V. Jagannathan
Jagannatha Rao (1931/32–1938/39) 
Laxmidas Jai (1926/27) 
Rustomji Jamshedji (1926/27) 
P. Janardhan (1933/34–1936/37)
S. M. Joshi (1922/23)

K

L
Cheruvari Lakshmanan (1925/26–1930/31)
P. V. Lakshmanan (1938/39)
K. P. Lakshmanan Rao (1916/17–1920/21)

M

N
C. K. Nainakannu (1927/28–1945/46)
Narayanaswami Rao (1936/37–1940/41)
Janardan Navle (1922/23)
C. K. Nayudu (1920/21–1939/40)
C. L. Nayudu (1923/24)
C. S. Nayudu (1932/33–1947/48)
Nazir Ali (1925/26)

P

R

S

T
T. Thangavelu (1915/16–1921/22)
B. S. Thyagarajan (1936/37)

U
K. Ugappa Shetty (1927/28–1928/29)
M. A. Uttappa (1933/34–1936/37)

V
Hormasji Vajifdar (1922/23)
P. V. Varadan (1937/38)
T. Vasu (1915/16–1921/22)
M. G. Venkataraman (1945/46)
M. Venkataramanjulu (1915/16–1930/31)
N. J. Venkatesan (1939/40–1946/47)
Maharajkumar of Vizianagram (1930/31–1932/33)

W
Wazir Ali (1925/26)
Cedric Williams (1917/18)

Y
P. Yoganathan (1915/16–1927/28)

Notes

References

Lists of first-class cricketers
Lists of Indian cricketers